Sir Alfred John Callaghan (29 October 1865 – 31 May 1940), was an Irish/British barrister and Liberal Party politician.

Background
Callaghan was born the son of James Walker Callaghan, of Northumberland Road, Dublin. He obtained a Doctor of Law, from the University of Dublin. In 1914 he married Irene Knighton Warren of St John's Wood, London. He was knighted in 1915.

Professional career
Callaghan was member of the Irish Bar and of the Inner Temple, London.

Political career
Callaghan was Liberal candidate for the Unionist Eastbourne division of Sussex at the 1918 General Election. His Unionist opponent received endorsement from the Coalition Government and Callaghan finished third. He was Liberal candidate for the Chatham division of Kent at the 1922 General Election. This was another Unionist seat, but this time he finished second as there was no Labour candidate. In 1923 he again contested Chatham, and although a Labour candidate intervened, he again finished second. He did not stand for parliament again.

Electoral record

References

1865 births
1940 deaths
Liberal Party (UK) parliamentary candidates
Alumni of Trinity College Dublin
Members of the Inner Temple
19th-century Irish lawyers